The Chrystal Rose Show is a British talk show presented by Chrystal Rose. Produced by Carlton Television, the programme discussed controversial subjects and was first broadcast on ITV in January 1993.

References

External links
 IMDb Profile

1993 British television series debuts
1996 British television series endings
British television talk shows
ITV (TV network) original programming
Carlton Television
Television series by ITV Studios
English-language television shows